A Night Out with the Dubliners is a compilation of live recordings by the Irish folk band the Dubliners released in 1999 on compact disc in the UK, Ireland, Europe and Australia.  Most of the material comes from the album Live recorded in 1974, with the remainder of the tracks coming from the albums Live in Carré (1983) and Hometown! (1972), and it contains Ciarán Bourke's last performances after he was left partly paralysed later in 1974 following a stroke that later caused his death.

Track listing
The following tracks are on the album:
 Seven Drunken Nights
 Whiskey In The Jar
 McAlpine's Fusiliers
 Finnegan's Wake
 Fermoy Lasses/Sportin' Paddy
 The Black Velvet Band
 "Weila, Waile, Walia"
 The Holy Ground
 Kimmage (Three Lovely Lassies From)
 Home Boys Home
 I Knew Patrick Kavanagh
 Dicey Riley
 The Galway Races
 The Four Poster Bed/Colonel Riley
 Wild Rover
 Dirty Old Town
 All For Me Grog
 Monto
 Hand Me Down My Bible
 The Scholar/The Teetotaller/The High Reel

References

The Dubliners live albums
1974 albums